Hawaii Kotohira Jinsha – Hawaii Dazaifu Tenmangu is a Shinto shrine established in Honolulu, Hawaii in 1924.

An annual blessing of animals is undertaken at the shrine.

References

Hawaii Kotohira Jinsha – Hawaii Dazaifu Tenmangu

External links
 Hawaii Kotohira Jinsha - Hawaii Dazaifu Tenmangu

Japanese-American culture in Honolulu
Shinto shrines in the United States
Religious buildings and structures in Honolulu
1924 establishments in Hawaii
Religious buildings and structures completed in 1924
20th-century Shinto shrines